Gabriel Nadales is a conservative and libertarian activist who was formerly a part of the Antifa movement. He is currently the National Director for the pro-American organization Our America. 

In 2016, Gabe was nominated for the Network of enlightened Women Gentleman of the Year Under 30 award.

Activism 
In 2014, while Nadales was a member of the libertarian organization Young Americans for Liberty at Citrus College, he and his chapter sued the school, alleging several constitutional violations. In response, Citrus College agreed to change its policies and pay $110,000 in legal fees.

In 2019, Nadales was invited to the White House by the Trump administration to witness the signing of an executive order meant to promote free speech on college campuses. Also in 2019, Nadales claimed that Antifa is "trying to hurt" and "harass" and called for the movement to be labeled a "Domestic Terrorism" threat.

On November 20, 2019, Turning Point USA's Emerson chapter hosted Nadales, who called for open dialogue across the political aisle and a breakdown of America's left-wing "conservative caricature." 

In June 2020, on The Ingraham Angle show on Fox News, Nadales responded to U.S. Representative Jerry Nadler's claim that Antifa is an "imaginary" group, saying "That's just false" and "the protests I attended ... weren't imaginary. Also, the windows that I regrettably broke, they weren't imaginary."

Books 
Nadales is the author of  Behind the Black Mask: My Time as an Antifa Activist published by the Post Hill Press in 2020. Nadales also contributed to Unmasking Antifa: Five Perspectives on a Growing Threat, which was published by Center for Security Policy, also in 2020.

References 

American political activists
21st-century American non-fiction writers
Living people
Year of birth missing (living people)